Roman Alexander Quaedvlieg  (born 8 January 1965) is a former Australian public servant and police officer who was the Commissioner of the Australian Border Force (ABF) from 1 July 2015 until May 2017 when he was put on paid leave while an investigation took place. He was dismissed from the position in March 2018 after an investigation found that he had failed to comply with disclosure requirements regarding a relationship with a woman.

Previously he served as a police officer in Queensland, then with the Australian Federal Police. He then joined the Australian Customs and Border Protection Service (ACBPS) as deputy chief executive officer, later becoming its chief executive officer. When the ACBPS was merged into the new Australian Border Force, he became its inaugural commissioner and Comptroller-General of Customs.

Education
Quaedvlieg was educated at Redcliffe State High School.  Quaedvlieg has a Bachelor of Justice from the Queensland University of Technology, and a Master of Business Administration from the Melbourne Business School (MBS) of the University of Melbourne, Victoria, Australia.

Career
A career police officer, Quaedvlieg served as a sworn member of the Queensland Police Service for 15 years, where he performed duties in a range of positions investigating and managing serious and organised criminal activity.  From 2000 to 2002 he was an executive with Ansett Australia.

2005

In 2005, Quaedvlieg joined the Australian Federal Police (AFP) and assumed the position of Manager Economic Operations, with responsibility for financial and economic investigations including money-laundering, large-scale fraud against the Commonwealth, proceeds of crime recovery, identity crime enforcement, and the management of the Oil-for-Food Task Force.

In 2007, Quaedvlieg was promoted to Assistant Commissioner at the AFP and assumed responsibility for Border Operations, which encompassed investigations of major drug importation and trafficking, people-smuggling activity, sexual servitude, and child sex tourism offences. Quaedvlieg has also performed the role of National Manager Aviation (at the Assistant Commissioner level) and was the AFP Chief of Staff for a period of time, a role which incorporated responsibility for the governance mechanisms of the AFP, including Ministerial Liaison, National Media and Marketing, Legal Services, Professional Standards, Recognition and Ceremonial, and Executive Services.

2010

In 2010, Quaedvlieg became the Chief Police Officer of ACT Policing, the branch of the AFP responsible for providing policing services to the Australian Capital Territory (ACT).

Quaedvlieg was awarded the Australian Police Medal (APM) in 2011 for serving the Australian community with distinction, particularly in the areas of police operations and administration.

In 2013 Quaedvlieg joined the Australian Customs and Border Protection Service (ACBPS) as deputy chief executive officer. In October 2014 he succeeded Mike Pezzullo as chief executive officer.

With the introduction of the Australian Border Force (ABF) in 2015, Quaedvlieg became the inaugural Commissioner of the Australian Border Force and the Comptroller-General of Customs.

2017

As of 29 May 2017 he was on leave pending an active investigation conducted by the Australian Commission for Law Enforcement Integrity into Quaedvlieg's alleged abuse of power. The investigation examined his assistance in obtaining employment at Sydney Airport for a person he was in a relationship with, and concealing that relationship.  Quaedvlieg declined to resign, stating that to do so would be "tantamount to a concession of culpability".  Martin Parkinson, the secretary of the Department of Prime Minister and Cabinet also wrote a report on Quaedvlieg's behaviour, and Christian Porter, the attorney-general, was asked to rule on the case to avoid questions of disfavour that may have arisen had Peter Dutton ruled on Quaedvlieg's case.  There was media criticism that Quaedvlieg was on paid leave during this time, and reportedly was paid in excess of $500,000 between May 2017 and February 2018.

In March 2018 the Governor-General, acting on the advice of the Australian cabinet, terminated Quaedvlieg's appointment as commissioner on the grounds of his misbehaviour.

Quaedvlieg has joined Twitter with an unverified account, which Buzzfeed has confirmed is linked to his phone number, and has described himself there as a "geopolitical dilettante", commentating on political matters.

Honours

State
 G20 Citation.
 Queensland Police Service Medal.

Personal life
Quaedvlieg has three children.

References

Attribution
 Content in this Wikipedia article was based on the Roman Quaedvlieg APM, listed on the "Department of Immigration and Border Protection", published by the Commonwealth of Australia under CC-BY 3.0 licence (accessed on 30 November 2016). Archived March 2018.

1965 births
Living people
Australian public servants
Recipients of the Australian Police Medal
Chief Police Officers of ACT Policing